The 1973–74 Macedonian Republic League was the 30th since its establishment. FK Teteks won their 3rd championship title.

Participating teams

Final table

External links
SportSport.ba
Football Federation of Macedonia 

Macedonian Football League seasons
Yugo
3